Chanida Sutthiruang (Thai:ชนิดา สุทธิเรือง, born 16 July 1993) is a Thai cricketer. She played for the Thailand women's national cricket team in the 2017 Women's Cricket World Cup Qualifier in February 2017. She was the first cricketer for Thailand to take a hat-trick in a Women's Twenty20 International match.

Career
In June 2018, she was named in Thailand's squad for the 2018 ICC Women's World Twenty20 Qualifier tournament. She made her Women's Twenty20 International (WT20I) debut for Thailand on 3 June 2018, in the 2018 Women's Twenty20 Asia Cup. She was the joint-leading wicket-taker for Thailand in the tournament, with six dismissals in five matches.

In August 2019, she was named in Thailand's squad for the 2019 ICC Women's World Twenty20 Qualifier tournament in Scotland. She was the leading wicket-taker in the tournament, with twelve dismissals in five matches, and she was named the player of the tournament.

In December 2019, the International Cricket Council (ICC) named her as the ICC Women's Emerging Player of the Year at their annual award ceremony. In January 2020, she was named in Thailand's squad for the 2020 ICC Women's T20 World Cup in Australia.

In November 2020, Sutthiruang was nominated for the ICC Women's Associate Cricketer of the Decade award. In November 2021, she was named in Thailand's team for the 2021 Women's Cricket World Cup Qualifier tournament in Zimbabwe. She played in Thailand's first match of the tournament, on 21 November 2021 against Zimbabwe.

In October 2022, she played for Thailand in Women's Twenty20 Asia Cup.

References

External links

 
 

1993 births
Living people
Chanida Sutthiruang
Chanida Sutthiruang
Chanida Sutthiruang
Chanida Sutthiruang
Cricketers at the 2014 Asian Games
Chanida Sutthiruang
Southeast Asian Games medalists in cricket
Competitors at the 2017 Southeast Asian Games
Chanida Sutthiruang
Chanida Sutthiruang